Jørgen Reenberg (born 8 November 1927) is a Danish film actor. He has appeared in 30 films since 1948. He was born in Denmark. He is the brother of Danish film director Annelise Reenberg.

He made his film debut in Three Years Later from 1948 and his latest film is I am Dina from 2002. He has worked at the Royal Theatre. He has played such diverse roles as Horace in The School for Women (Molière), Albert Ebbesen in Elverhøj (Heiberg), Meyer and Old Levin in Within the Walls (Nathansen) and the Admiral in H.M.S. Pinafore (Gilbert and Sullivan).

He received a Reumert for Best Male Lead in 2006, alternating Levin in Inside the Walls at the Royal Theatre in 2005.

Selected filmography
 We Want a Child! (1949)
 I gabestokken (1950)
 Fodboldpræsten (1951)
 Father of Four (1953)
 Be Dear to Me (1957)
 Krudt og klunker (1958)
 Skibet er ladet med (1960)
 Tine (1964)
 Europa (1991)

References

External links

1927 births
Living people
Danish male film actors
People from Frederiksberg